Eucalyptus discreta is a species of shrub or mallee that is endemic to Western Australia. It has smooth creamy brown and pale grey bark, narrow-lance-shaped adult leaves, flower buds in groups of seven or nine, creamy-white flowers and barrel-shaped fruit.

Description
The bark is smooth creamy brown and pale grey, often with coarse ribbons of loose bark toward the base of the stem. Flowering occurs between January and April and the flowers are creamy white.

Taxonomy and naming
Eucalyptus discreta was first formally described by the botanist Ian Brooker in 1979 in the journal Brunonia.

This species is part of the Eucalyptus subgenus Symphyomyrtus in the section Bisectae and the subsection Destitutae. It is closely related to E. uncinata in which the juvenile leaves are joined at the base.

Distribution and habitat
This mallee grows in open shrubland on flats in coastal areas in the Goldfields-Esperance region between Ravensthorpe and the Nullarbor Plain in sandy-loamy soils usually over limestone or granite.

Conservation status
Eucalyptus discreta is classified as "not threatened" by the Western Australian Government Department of Parks and Wildlife.

See also
List of Eucalyptus species

References

Eucalypts of Western Australia
discreta
Myrtales of Australia
Plants described in 1979
Taxa named by Ian Brooker